The Buenos Aires Stock Exchange (BCBA) is the organization responsible for the operation of Argentina's primary stock exchange located at Buenos Aires CBD. Founded in 1854, it is the successor to the Banco Mercantil, which was created in 1822 by Bernardino Rivadavia.

Citing BCBA's self-definition: "It is a self-regulated non-profit civil association. At its Council sit representatives of all different sectors of Argentina's economy."

The most important index of the stock market is the MERVAL (from MERcado de VALores, "stock market"), which includes the most important papers. Other indexes are Burcap, Bolsa General and M.AR., and currency indicators Indol and Wholesale Indol.

The Stock Exchange's current, Leandro Alem Avenue headquarters was designed by Norwegian-Argentine architect Alejandro Christophersen in 1913, and completed in 1916. A modernist annex was designed by local architect Mario Roberto Álvarez in 1972, and inaugurated in 1977.

See also

Economy of Argentina
List of stock exchanges
List of American stock exchanges

External links
 
 MERVAL official page
 Burcap

Financial services companies established in 1854
1854 establishments in Argentina
Stock Exchange
Stock Exchange
Stock exchanges in South America
Stock Exchange
Commercial buildings completed in 1916
Financial services companies of Argentina
Finance in Argentina